HOSA may mean:

 HOSA (organization), HOSA-Future Health Professionals (formerly the Health Occupations Students of America)
 Hydroxylamine-O-sulfonic acid, chemical

Hosa may mean:

Hosa Ice Hockey Team
Chief Little Raven (c. 1810–1889), also known as "Hosa" (Young Crow), American Indian chief of the Southern Arapaho